Lindenwold station is a train station in Lindenwold, New Jersey, United States, served by the NJ Transit Atlantic City Line regional rail service and the rapid transit PATCO Speedline. Lindenwold is the eastern terminus of PATCO; the system's headquarters and maintenance facility are located adjacent to the station in neighboring Voorhees.

The station is also served by NJ Transit buses. The station opened in 1969 and also served Amtrak from 1989 to 1994.

History 

The Pennsylvania-Reading Seashore Lines (PRSL) formerly operated a station at nearby Kirkwood. On January 4, 1969, the Bridge Line subway was extended as the PATCO Speedline to a park-and-ride terminus at Lindenwold. PRSL service was cut back from Philadelphia to Lindenwold; passengers had to transfer to reach Philadelphia. This forced transfer hurt already dwindling ridership, and the service (by then operated by Conrail and funded by the state) ended on June 30, 1982.

On May 21, 1989, Amtrak began operating the Atlantic City Express service from New York and Washington to Atlantic City, with Lindenwold as an intermediate stop. NJ Transit began operating local service between Atlantic City and Lindenwold on September 17, 1989. Some NJ Transit trains were extended from Lindenwold to Philadelphia on May 2, 1993. NJ Transit opened Cherry Hill station on July 2, 1994; Amtrak began stopping there instead of Lindenwold. Amtrak service to Atlantic City ended entirely on April 2, 1995; all NJ Transit service was extended to Philadelphia at that time. However, Lindenwold is still commonly used to transfer between NJ Transit and PATCO service.

In 2011, NJ Transit began construction of a new PATCO waiting room, Atlantic City Line shelter, a new platform entrance, and other work. The modifications were originally intended to be completed in 2012, but took until 2014.

Starting in 2021, as part of PATCO's "Station Enhancements Project", Lindenwold station is in the process of being remodeled. Changes include the replacement of glass block windows with a curtain wall system, and a complete interior re-build, including remodeled headhouses and station platforms, backlit entrance signage, and white interior and exterior LED lighting.  Additionally, solar panels have been installed as part of a solar farm project to provide more than half of PATCO's electricity needs at Lindenwold as well as other above ground stations.  A side benefit will provide covered parking for patrons.

Station layout

References

External links 

Lindenwold (PATCO)

Lindenwold, New Jersey
NJ Transit Rail Operations stations
PATCO Speedline stations in New Jersey
Former Pennsylvania-Reading Seashore Lines stations
Former Amtrak stations in New Jersey
Amtrak Thruway Motorcoach stations in New Jersey
Railway stations in the United States opened in 1969
1969 establishments in New Jersey